Appanoose Township is one of twenty-four townships in Hancock County, Illinois, USA.  As of the 2010 census, its population was 435 and it contained 232 housing units.

Geography

Unincorporated towns
 Niota at 
 Old Niota at 
(This list is based on USGS data and may include former settlements.)

Cemeteries
The township contains Appanoose Cemetery.

Major highways
  Illinois Route 9
  Illinois Route 96

Airports and landing strips
 Sineles Sunset Strip
 Winchester Airport

Demographics

School districts
 Nauvoo-Colusa Community Unit School District 325

Political districts
 Illinois's 17th congressional district
 State House District 94
 State Senate District 47

References
 United States Census Bureau 2008 TIGER/Line Shapefiles
 
 United States National Atlas

External links
 City-Data.com
 Illinois State Archives
 Township Officials of Illinois

Townships in Hancock County, Illinois
Populated places established in 1849
Townships in Illinois
1849 establishments in Illinois